Planica 1954 was an international ski flying week competition, held from 13 to 14 March 1954 in Planica, PR Slovenia, FPR Yugoslavia. It was the first event after first huge hill renovation. 25,000 people visited in four days.

Schedule

Competitions
On 11 March 1954, first training on Srednja Bloudkova K80 normal hill was on schedule, which also counted as qualification for main event on large hill, with about total 100 jumps in all rounds. Norwegian ski jumper Thynes was the longest with 82 metres that day, meanwhile Swedish ski jumper Erlandson touched the snow at 86 metres. Janez Gorišek was the best among domestic jumpers at 70 metres.

On 12 March 1954, they made one trial jump on K80 in the morning, when 42 years old Birger Ruud jumped 62 m and the longest was Laaksonen with 74.5 m. Later first training in three rounds, on completely renovated Bloudkova velikanka K120 hill was on schedule with 41 athletes on start. At 11:15 AM there was official opening of renovated hill with new "Planica Fanfares" theme song. Norwegian ski jumper Jack Alfredsen set the distance of the day  at 109 m.

On 13 March 1954, first day of competition with 38 competitors on start was on schedule in front of 8,000 people. With one trial round and two rounds counting for result. Jack Alfredsen was the longest with 110 metres, leading after two jumps.

On 14 March 1954, second and the final day of competition was on schedule in front of 15,000 people. With one trial round and only one round in count due to bad weather conditions. Jack Alfredsen set the longest valid distance of this year competition at 114.5 metres and crashed at 119 metres. Finnish ski jumper Ossi Laaksonen won the two days competitions by points.

Training 1 (Qualifications) 
11 March 1954 – Srednja Bloudkova K80 – Three rounds – incomplete

Training 2 
12 March 1954 – 11:15 AM – Bloudkova velikanka K120 – Three rounds – incomplete

International Ski Flying Week: Day 1 
13 March 1954 – Three rounds – incomplete

 Fall or touch!

International Ski Flying Week: Day 2 
14 March 1954 – 10 AM – Two rounds – incomplete

Official results 

13–14 March 1954 – Three rounds (2+1)

References

1954 in Yugoslav sport
1954 in ski jumping
1954 in Slovenia
Ski jumping competitions in Yugoslavia
International sports competitions hosted by Yugoslavia
Ski jumping competitions in Slovenia
International sports competitions hosted by Slovenia